Filisovo is a rural locality (a village) in Kubenskoye  Rural Settlement, Vologodsky District, Vologda Oblast, Russia. The population was 12 as of 2002.

Geography 
Filisovo is located 42 km northwest of Vologda (the district's administrative centre) by road. Novoye is the nearest rural locality.

References 

Rural localities in Vologodsky District